Omdurman sports stadium is a multi-use stadium in Omdurman, Sudan. It is currently used mostly for football matches and is the home of Al-Mourada football club. The stadium has a capacity of 14,000 people.

Omdurman
Omdurman